{{DISPLAYTITLE:C12H14N2O}}
The molecular formula C12H14N2O (molar mass: 202.25 g/mol, exact mass: 202.1106 u) may refer to:

 Acetryptine, also known as 5-acetyltryptamine (5-AT)
 N-Acetyltryptamine
 Pinoline
 Tetrahydroharmol

Molecular formulas